WFAS (1230 AM HD Radio) is a commercial digital-only radio station licensed to serve White Plains, New York. The station is owned by Cumulus Media and broadcasts at 1,000 watts from a transmitter site on Secor Road, in Hartsdale, New York. WFAS airs a conservative talk radio format with programming from Westwood One, which is itself owned by Cumulus Media.  News updates are supplied by USA Radio News.

The station began all-digital HD Radio broadcasting on May 24, 2021, after notifying the Federal Communications Commission (FCC).

History
WFAS's first license, as WBRS, was granted on August 19, 1926, to Universal Radio Manufacturing, Inc., located at 1062 Broadway in Brooklyn, New York. In 1928 the station was taken over by the Westchester Broadcasting Corporation, which changed the call sign to WCOH and relocated to the Greenville neighborhood in Yonkers.

Due to the limited number of frequencies available for the highly congested New York City region, it was common beginning in the mid-1920s to require multiple stations to share a common frequency. On June 15, 1927, WBRS was assigned to 1420 kHz along with two other area stations. On November 11, 1928, under the provisions of the Federal Radio Commission's (FRC) General Order 40, the now-WCOH was reassigned to 1210 kHz on a shared time basis with three different stations.

In 1932 the call letters were changed to WFAS, and the station relocated to White Plains. This call sign honored the two owners' husband and father, Frank A. Seitz, Sr. WFAS made its debut on August 11, 1932, from the Roger Smith Hotel, on the corner of Post Road and Chester Avenue in White Plains. WFAS initially broadcast with 100 watts using a T-top antenna located on the hotel's roof.

In 1941, with the implementation of the North American Regional Broadcasting Agreement (NARBA), most stations on 1210 kHz, including WFAS, were reassigned to 1240 kHz. By March 1943, the station had moved to 1230 kHz, becoming a full-time operation which no longer had to share its frequency with any other stations. In 1947, the transmitter site moved to its current location on Secor Road in the Town of Greenburgh. Concurrent with that move, WFAS-FM (103.9) signed on the air on August 1, from the same location.  The T-top antenna continued to be used as an auxiliary while the studios remained at the Roger Smith Hotel.

In 1948, WFAS and WFAS-FM moved to new studios and offices in the building of the White Plains Reporter Dispatch newspaper. By 1954, the studios had moved out of the City of White Plains into the Secor Road location.  In 1963, the station increased power to 1,000 watts.

In 2011, WFAS began a trial of sports programming with Bob Wolfe, in addition to station originals such as Bruce Hall's Second Opinion, which featured Bruce Hall and Roy G. Edwards, founder of Sports Mancave, which aired for 3 years before WFAS moved transmitters. Second Opinion hosted such events as the Westchester Golf Show, and had recurring guests of Clarke Judge, San Francisco Giants manager Bruce Bochy, and NFL Network contributor Russle Baxter.

In 2014, WFAS-FM changed its call sign to WNBM, moved its transmitter site to The Bronx and its studios to Cumulus' Penn Plaza facilities in Midtown Manhattan, to become an urban adult contemporary station serving the New York metropolitan area.

On February 3, 2016, WFAS changed formats from talk radio to sports, branded as "Sportsradio 1230", with programming from CBS Sports Radio.

On April 20, 2021, it was announced that WFAS had notified the FCC of their intentions to convert to an exclusively digital HD Radio signal, their plan being to complete the process by May 24. The station would be the third AM station in the United States to do so, following WWFD in Frederick, Maryland (broadcasting to the Washington D.C. area) and WMGG near Tampa, Florida. However, unlike these other two stations, WFAS's programming is not also carried over an analog FM translator. With the announcement, WFAS would also flip to conservative talk the same day, branded as "Digital AM 1230, New Talk for New York", featuring a variety of conservative talk shows otherwise not cleared in the market. CBS Sports Radio continued to fill weekend timeslots. On December 15, 2021, Cumulus announced that WNBM would begin simulcasting WFAS on January 3, 2022, giving the station an analog signal; the simulcast ended on February 6, 2023, after 103.9 (which had returned to the WFAS-FM call sign) was sold to VCY America and became WVBN.

References

External links

 (covering 1927-1981 as WBRS/WCOH/WFAS)

FAS (AM)
Cumulus Media radio stations
Radio stations established in 1926
1926 establishments in New York City
Talk radio stations in the United States
Conservative talk radio